"Pearl's a Singer" is a song made famous by the British singer Elkie Brooks, as taken from her 1977 album Two Days Away which was produced by the song's co-writers Jerry Leiber and Mike Stoller. The original version of "Pearl's a Singer" had been introduced by the duo Dino and Sembello – also the song's co-writers – on their 1974 self-titled album which Leiber and Stoller had produced.

The song is a ballad, telling the story of a failed singer who still dreams of the success she might have had.

History
Brooks would recall that at a rehearsal session for her Two Days Away album "Jerry Leiber [said]: 'I want to play you this song, I don't think you're going to like it, it's too countryish for you but I'll play it for you anyway.'...I said: 'Go on, I've got an open mind, I like a lot of country [music].' I listened to 'Pearl's a Singer' and told [Leiber & Stoller] I liked it but that they needed to [modify it with] a middle section. To which Jerry said: 'No problem'. And with that he disappeared and came back half an hour later with the [modified] version of 'Pearl's a Singer'" which Brooks recorded. Brooks - "To be honest [in the mid-1970s] I just wanted to enjoy myself in music and I never thought 'Pearl...' was going to be a big hit but [after] it was released on my birthday in 1977 the record company really pushed it, [it] got played on all the radio stations and became very successful. No one was more surprised than me."

Chart performance
"Pearl's a Singer" afforded Elkie Brooks her debut chart single – thirteen years after she'd recorded her first track – reaching No. 8 on the UK Singles Chart in spring 1977. It remained her highest placing in that chart until "No More the Fool" reached No. 5, in early 1987.

Personnel
Elkie Brooks – vocals
Isaac Guillory – guitars
Jean Roussel – keyboards
Trevor Morais – drums
Steve York – bass

Additional personnel
Mike Stoller – keyboards
Eric Weissberg – guitars
George Devens – percussion
Muscle Shoals Horns
Harrison Calloway (arranger)
Charlie Rose
Harvey Thompson
Ronnie Eades
Meco Monardo (arranger), Tony Posk, Guy Lumia, Elliot Rosoff, Rick Sortonne, Carol Webb, Joe Goodman, Julien Barber, Jesse Levy – strings
Carl Hall, Peggy Blue, Marry Ellen Johnson – backing vocals

Charts

Weekly charts

Year-end charts

References

1977 singles
Elkie Brooks songs
Songs written by Jerry Leiber and Mike Stoller
1977 songs
A&M Records singles